A notifiable disease is one which the law requires to be reported to government authorities. In Switzerland, the Federal Office of Public Health is in charge of tracking the notifiable diseases.

List of notifiable diseases in Switzerland

This is the list of notifiable diseases in Switzerland for 2020.

References

Switzerland
Infectious disease-related lists